I'm Not Following You is an album by Scottish musician Edwyn Collins released in 1997.

Track listing
All tracks composed by Edwyn Collins; except where indicated
"It's a Steal" - 5:23
"The Magic Piper (Of Love)" - 3:49
"Seventies Night" (Collins, Mark E. Smith) - 4:58
"No One Waved Goodbye" - 4:35
"Downer" - 4:05
"Keep on Burning" - 4:09
"Running Away with Myself" - 4:19
"Country Rock" - 4:34
"For the Rest of My Life" - 4:17
"Superficial Cat" - 5:10
"Adidas World" - 2:28
"I'm Not Following You" - 7:28

Personnel
Edwyn Collins - guitar, keyboards, percussion, programming, vocals
Andrew Hackett, Boz Boorer - guitar
Sebastian Lewsley - programming
David Ruffy, Peter Jones, Paul Cook - drums
Clare Kenny - bass
Naomi Samuel - cello
David Munday - flute
Martin Drover - trumpet, flugelhorn
Phil Thornalley - bass guitar, Wurlitzer
Mark E. Smith - vocals on "Seventies Night"
Sean Read - keyboards, baritone saxophone, backing vocals
Marcia McDonald - backing vocals

References

1997 albums
Edwyn Collins albums
Setanta Records albums
Albums produced by Edwyn Collins